The discography of New Zealand indie rock band Evermore, consists of four studio albums, two compilation albums, six extended plays, sixteen singles, one video album and twenty three music videos.

Albums

Studio albums

Compilation albums

Extended plays

Singles

Promotional singles

Other appearances

Videography

Video albums

Music videos

References

External links 
 
 

Discographies of New Zealand artists
Discography
Rock music group discographies